The 2018 San Marino and Rimini Riviera motorcycle Grand Prix was the thirteenth round of the 2018 MotoGP season. It was held at the Misano World Circuit Marco Simoncelli in Misano Adriatico on 9 September 2018.

Classification

MotoGP

Moto2

 Romano Fenati was excluded from the race for grabbing Stefano Manzi's brake lever.

Moto3

 Philipp Öttl suffered a concussion following a crash in qualifying and withdrew from the event.

Championship standings after the race

MotoGP

Moto2

Moto3

Notes

References

San Marino
San Marino and Rimini Riviera motorcycle Grand Prix
San Marino and Rimini Riviera motorcycle Grand Prix
San Marino and Rimini Riviera motorcycle Grand Prix